HTML5 Boilerplate is an HTML, CSS and JavaScript template (or boilerplate) for creating HTML5 websites with cross-browser compatibility.

References

External links

HTML5 Boilerplate on GitHub

HTML5
Web development
2011 software